Marc T. Lombardo is an American politician who represents the 22nd Middlesex District in the Massachusetts House of Representatives. He is a former member of the Billerica, Massachusetts Board of Selectmen (2005–2010) and a former Billerica town meeting member (2004–2010).

See also
 2019–2020 Massachusetts legislature
 2021–2022 Massachusetts legislature

References 

Merrimack College alumni
Living people
Republican Party members of the Massachusetts House of Representatives
People from Billerica, Massachusetts
21st-century American politicians
Year of birth missing (living people)